James Leslie Weatherhead  (29 March 1931 – 20 May 2017) was a minister of the Church of Scotland and the Moderator of the General Assembly of the Church of Scotland for 1993–1994.

Background and career
James Leslie Weatherhead was born in Dundee on 29 March 1931. He was the grandson of Rev Dr James Weatherhead of St Pauls UF Church in Dundee, and his wife, Margaret McDougall Kilpatrick. His grandfather was Moderator of the General Assembly of the United Free Church of Scotland in 1927.

He was a graduate of the University of Edinburgh, where he was President of the Students' Representative Council.

He was minister at Trinity Church, Rothesay, Isle of Bute until 1969, when he became minister at the Old Parish Church, Montrose. He demitted his charge in 1985 to become Principal Clerk to the General Assembly of the Church of Scotland, a post he held until his retirement in 1996. He was succeeded as Principal Clerk by the Reverend Dr Finlay Macdonald.

During his Moderatorial year he sparked controversy over a sermon he gave in St Giles' Cathedral, Edinburgh, where spoke in support of Dr David Jenkins (the former Bishop of Durham) in his interpretation of the account of the virgin birth of Jesus Christ.

He appointed a Chaplain to the Queen in 1991 and was appointed a CBE in the 1997 New Year Honours for ecumenical work and public service.

Following the end of his Moderatorial year, his official title was the Very Reverend Dr James Leslie Weatherhead CBE MA LLB DD. He died on 20 May 2017.

See also
List of Moderators of the General Assembly of the Church of Scotland

References

External links
Letter by Dr Weatherhead to the Kirriemuir Herald, 11 June 2008
The Independent - the meaning of Christmas

1931 births
2017 deaths
People educated at the High School of Dundee
Commanders of the Order of the British Empire
20th-century Ministers of the Church of Scotland
Moderators of the General Assembly of the Church of Scotland
People from Dundee